Alina Zotea-Durnea (born 8 December 1986) is a Moldovan economist, model and politician.

Born in Cantemir, she became a model at age fifteen, and continued her involvement in the activity through her twenties. She graduated from high school in 2007, and in 2011 obtained a degree from the economics faculty of Moldova State University.

Zotea joined the Liberal Party (PL) in 2005, and became a personal assistant to party leader Mihai Ghimpu in 2014. In that year's election for the Parliament of Moldova, she ran on the party's lists, in 19th position. During the campaign, some online commentators questioned her fitness for office, citing her provocative modeling photographs. In August 2015, when five PL members of parliament resigned in order to join the new Streleț Cabinet, one of the vacancies fell to Zotea, who agreed to fill it. Her term began early the following month, after validation from the Constitutional Court.

In autumn 2017, Zotea married Vlad Durnea; she gave birth to a child a year later.

References

1986 births
Living people
People from Cantemir District
Moldova State University alumni
Liberal Party (Moldova) MPs
Moldovan female MPs
Moldovan female models
21st-century Moldovan women politicians
21st-century Moldovan  economists